"Ich weiß, es wird einmal ein Wunder gescheh’n" ("I Know Some Day a Miracle Will Happen") is a song composed by Bruno Balz and Michael Jary, which was originally recorded by  Swedish actress and singer Zarah Leander. It first appeared in the 1942 film Die große Liebe.

Nina Hagen cover
German recording artist Nina Hagen covered the song and titled it as "Zarah" or "Zarah (Ich weiß, es wird einmal ein Wunder geschehn)" for her album Angstlos. It was released as the album's second single in 1983.  The song was later included on Hagen's compilation albums 14 Friendly Abductions, Prima Nina in Ekstasy and The Very Best of Nina Hagen.

Track listing
 "Zarah (Ich weiß, es wird einmal ein Wunder geschehn)" - 5:02
 "Frühling In Paris" - 3:35

Charts

References

1942 songs
1983 singles
Nina Hagen songs
Song recordings produced by Giorgio Moroder